A photo shoot is the process taken by creatives and models that results in a visual objective being obtained. An example is a model posing for a photographer at a studio or an outdoor location.  

A photo shoot is a series of images that are taken, with the goal of obtaining images that can then be placed into post-production, or editing. These images are then used for print/digital advertising, business collateral, or just for personal use. 

An amateur photo shoot is more likely to be under the arrangement of Trade-For-Portfolio (TFP), whereas a professional photo shoot for a brand or product is likely to be a paid arrangement. With TFP photo shoots, the agreement is often that everyone involved in the shoot will receive the high-resolution, edited images as a form of payment.

With professional photo shoots, the contract is generally signed via a representative modelling agency and so payment is generally always monetary. Due to this, models may not be guaranteed to get the images returned to them as it is the property of the hiring firm/individual. Many photo shoots hire models from professional modelling agencies, and may also hire stylists, makeup and hair artists.

Types of Photo shoots
Food and beverage photography
Product and lifestyle photography
Architecture and interior photography
E-commerce photography
General lifestyle photography
Portrait photography
Conceptual photography
Posed Newborn Photography
Photojournalism 
Fashion Photography
Sports Photography 
Still Life Photography 
Editorial Photography 
Documentary Photography 
Nature Photography 
Landscape Photography 
Astrophotography 
Pet Photography 
Storm Photography 
Macro Photography 
Flower Photography 
Real Estate Photography 
Drone Photography 
Headshot Photography 
Black and White Photography 
Fine Art Photography
Street Photography 
Wedding Photography 
Double Exposure Photography 
Surreal Photography 
Abstract Photography

Gallery

See also
Glamour photography

References

External links

Fashion
Articles containing video clips

ja:写真#写真の撮影